The Liptov Baldspotted Rabbit is a Slovak breed of domestic rabbit. It was officially recognized in 2005. There are three colour varieties: agouti, blue-agouti, and black. The pattern on the head is a white blaze (similar to "Dutch" head markings), but there are no other white markings anywhere on the rabbit. It has been bred in the Liptov region of Slovakia.

See also

List of rabbit breeds

References

External links
 Club of Breeders of Liptovský lysko - Photo gallery

Rabbit breeds
Rabbit breeds originating in Slovakia